Nikonorovka is a rural locality (a khutor) in Aleynikovskoye Rural Settlement, Rossoshansky District, Voronezh Oblast, Russia. The population was 59 as of 2010.

Geography 
Nikonorovka is located 23 km northeast of Rossosh (the district's administrative centre) by road. Ilovka is the nearest rural locality.

References 

Rural localities in Rossoshansky District